Northfield Square is a shopping mall in Bradley, Illinois, in the United States. The mall serves Kankakee County, which included Bourbonnais, Bradley, and Kankakee. The mall's anchor store is Cinemark Theatres. There are 4 vacant anchor stores that were once 2 Carson Pirie Scott stores, Sears and JCPenney

History
Northfield Square opened on August 1, 1990, at the intersection of Illinois Route 50 and Larry Power Road, just north of the Interstate 57 interchange. The original anchors were Carson Pirie Scott, JCPenney, Sears, and Venture. When the mall opened in 1990, it was 40 percent vacant. In 2012, the mall was 11.7 percent vacant. On June 20, 2018, it was announced that Express Factory Outlet would open in the mall. The store would open next to Carson Pirie Scott. Around the corner from Daily Journal (since relocated to 8 Dearborn Square) near JCPenney opened Willow Spa and Barbershop On The Square, right next to Paul Mitchell - The School. On January 4, 2018, it was announced that Sears would be closing as part of a plan to close 103 stores nationwide. The store closed on April 9, 2018. On April 18, 2018, it was announced that Carson Pirie Scott would also be closing both locations on August 29, 2018 as parent company The Bon-Ton Stores was going out of business leaving JCPenney as the sole anchor at the mall.

On June 4, 2020, it was announced that JCPenney would be closing around October 2020 as part of a plan to close 154 stores nationwide. When JCPenney closed, the mall no longer had a traditional anchor store left. Cinemark Theatres is the largest current tenant. The mall is expected to be redeveloped in the future, with the Village of Bradley having purchased the former Carson's Men's Store anchor in October 2019.

References

External links
Northfield Square website

Shopping malls in Illinois
Shopping malls established in 1990
1990 establishments in Illinois
Buildings and structures in Kankakee County, Illinois
Tourist attractions in Kankakee County, Illinois
Namdar Realty Group